Guam sent a team to compete at the 2008 Summer Olympics in Beijing, China. Their flag bearer was Ricardo Blas Jr.

Athletics 

Derek Mandell trained for the Olympics by running for about 40 minutes in the morning, lifting weights, and running in the ocean for extra resistance.

Men

Women

Canoeing

Sprint

Qualification Legend: QS = Qualify to semi-final; QF = Qualify directly to final

Judo

Swimming

Men

Wrestling 

Maria Dunn was the flagbearer for the opening ceremonies of the Games.

Women's freestyle

References

Nations at the 2008 Summer Olympics
2008
Summer Olympics